Haruka to Miyuki (ハルカトミユキ) are a female Japanese folk-rock duo. They first met in 2008 at a Rikkyo University music club.

Biography 
On November 14, 2012, they released their first EP "Kyogensha ga Yoake wo Tsugeru. Bokutachi ga Itsumademo Damatteiruto Omouna" (虚言者が夜明けを告げる。僕達が、いつまでも黙っていると思うな) under the independent record label H+M Records.

In early 2013, they were named as one of the "NEW ARTISTS 2013" by iTunes Store.

In March 2013, their song "Dry Ice" (ドライアイス) from their newly released second EP was frequently played on national radio stations and music TV channels. The song charted at number 19 on Billboard Japan Hot 100 music chart.

On November 6, 2013, their first full album "Cyano Type" (シアノタイプ) was released under their new contract with major record label Sony Music Associated Records.

On August 30, 2014, they performed in Taiwan at "StreetVoice Park Park Carnival", a street music carnival located at Taipei Expo Park.

On October 3, 2015, they performed a concert at Hibiya Open-Air Concert Hall for a 3000-person crowd. A digital live album titled "Hitori×3000 LIVE at Hibiya Yagai Ongakudo 20151003" (ひとり×3000 LIVE at 日比谷野外大音楽堂20151003) was released on December 23, 2015 containing 14 songs from the event.

Members 
Haruka (ハルカ)
 Vocals, Guitar, and Lyrics
 Birthday: 
 Full Name: Haruka Fukushima (福島遥)
Haruka writes tanka poetry and released a mini songbook titled "Kono Natsu no Hanashi" (この夏の話; The Story of this Summer) containing newly written poems to celebrate Haruka to Miyuki's first acoustic live concert on September 20, 2014.

Miyuki (ミユキ)
 Keyboard, Chorus
 Birthday: 
Miyuki is a fan of Kurt Cobain and Freddie Mercury.

Discography

Demos 
 1st Demo
Natsu no Uta (夏のうた; Summer Song)
Bokutachi wa (僕達は; We Are)
 2nd Demo
Apart (アパート)
Sora (空; Sky)
Suisō (水槽; Aquarium)
Bokutachi wa (僕達は; We Are)
 3rd Demo
Magenta (マゼンタ)
MONDAY
POOL
385

Singles

Digital singles 
 Vanilla (October 31, 2012)
 Mannequin (マネキン) (October 9, 2013)
 mosaic (October 23, 2013)
 Sekai (世界; The World) (January 21, 2015)
 Usotsuki (嘘ツキ; Liar) (February 18, 2015)
 Kimi wa Mada Shiranai (君はまだ知らない; You Don't Know Yet) (March 18, 2015)
 Haru no Ame (春の雨; Spring Rain) (May 20, 2015)
 COPY (June 24, 2015)
 Uchuu wo Oyogu Fune (宇宙を泳ぐ舟; Ship that Sails Through Space) (July 29, 2015)
 Koutei Suru (肯定する; Affirm) (September 9, 2015)
 new moon (October 28, 2015)
 LIFE (November 25, 2015)
 World Wide Web wa Shinderu (ワールドワイドウエブは死んでる; The World Wide Web is Dead) (December 23, 2015)
 Koi wa Mahō sa (恋は魔法さ; Love is Magic) (January 27, 2016)
 Kiseki wo Inoru Koto wa Mō Shinai (奇跡を祈ることはもうしない; No Longer Praying For a Miracle) (June 22, 2016)
 DRAG & HUG (August 3, 2016)
 Asayake wa End Roll Youni (朝焼けはエンドロールのように; Morning glow is like end roll) (Aug 31, 2018)
 17 Sai (17才; 17 Years Old) (Oct 15, 2018)

Digital albums 
 Hitori×3000 LIVE at Hibiya Yagai Ongakudo 20151003 (ひとり×3000 LIVE at 日比谷野外大音楽堂20151003; One×3000 LIVE at Hibiya Open-Air Concert Hall 20151003) (December 23, 2015)

EPs

Mini-albums

Albums

DVDs

Compilation albums

References

External links 

Musical groups established in 2012
Japanese pop rock music groups
2012 establishments in Japan